Stefano Scarampella (1843 – ) was an Italian violin and cello maker. He is considered to be one of the best 20th century violin makers. The tonal quality of his instruments have been compared to those of Giovanni Battista Guadagnini. He did not start making violins and cellos until he was in his forties. Stefano's father Paolo was a part-time violin maker. His brother, Giuseppe Scarampella, was also a violin maker and Stefano worked with him until his brother's death in 1902. After which, Stefano, took full control over Giuseppe's tools and business.  He was born in  Brescia and moved to Mantua in 1886, where he died in 1925. His instruments are sought after by musicians and collectors. It is believed that he made between 800 and 900 instruments during his career.

Users
Tom Chiu
Jasper Wood
Walter-Michael Vollhardt

References

Italian luthiers
Businesspeople from Mantua
1925 deaths
Year of birth missing